Stamos is a surname of Greek origin. Notable people with the surname include:

Alex Stamos (born 1979), American computer scientist
David N. Stamos (born 1957), Canadian philosopher and professor
John Stamos (born 1963), American actor, producer, musician, and singer
John J. Stamos (1924–2017), Greek-American Justice of the Supreme Court of Illinois
Theodoros Stamos (1922–1997), Greek-American painter

Greek-language surnames
Surnames